"The Cookie Lady" is a horror short story by American writer Philip K. Dick. It was originally published in the June 1953 issue of the  magazine Fantasy Fiction.

Plot
Bernard "Bubber" Surle is a young boy who enjoys visiting Mrs. Drew, a lonely old widow who bakes him cookies. He visits her after school every day, and reads to her after eating cookies. Mrs. Drew, who has almost no company, enjoys having him. One day, she begins to undergo a transformation while he is there, becoming younger. Bubber, however, returns home very tired. His parents make him promise that his next visit will be his last. The next day, he stays longer, and Mrs. Drew is reverted to her younger self. Bubber, however, is drained of his physical energy, and while walking home is reduced to dust and is carried away by the wind.

External links
Page at the Internet Speculative Fiction Database
 "The Cookie Lady" at the Internet Archive

1953 short stories
Short stories by Philip K. Dick
Works originally published in Fantasy Fiction (magazine)
Horror short stories